"Ya Es Hora" (English: "It's About Time") is a song by Spanish singer Ana Mena, and American singers Becky G and De La Ghetto. It was released by Sony Spain on March 16, 2018. It was released as the sixth single from Mena's debut album, Index (2018).

Live performances
Ana Mena and Becky G performed "Ya Es Hora" together for the first time at the Factor X on June 29, 2018.

Charts

Weekly charts

Year-end charts

Certifications

References

2018 singles
2018 songs
Becky G songs
Ana Mena songs
Spanish-language songs